Belizean Americans are Americans who are of Belizean ancestry. These ancestors might be from Belize or of its diaspora.

Diaspora
About one out of every three Belizeans now live overseas and outside of Belize; the majority have migrated to Anglophone countries, especially the United States, where there are some 54,925 Belizeans, and the United Kingdom, with around 3,000 Belizeans. Smaller numbers now live in Canada.

Kriols and other ethnic groups are emigrating mostly to the United States, but also to the United Kingdom and other developed nations for better opportunities. Based on the latest U.S. Census, Belizeans in the United States are primarily of the Kriol and Garinagu ethnic groups of African, Native American and European descent, who are considered Black in the United States. In 1990, there were about 10,000 Belizean Americans citizens in the United States.

Notable people
 Avery August (born 1966), doctor and scientist
 Andrew Ballen (born 1973), entrepreneur and producer
 Pi'erre Bourne (born 1993), producer and rapper
 Zee Edgell (1940–2020), author
 Max Faget (1921–2004), mechanical engineer
 Noel Felix (born 1981), basketball player
 Kareem Ferguson (born 1986), actor
 O.T. Genasis (born 1987), rapper
 Erik Griffin (born 1988), comedian
 Houston (born 1983), singer
 Marion Jones (born 1975), track and field athlete and basketball player
 Ernest Lyon (1860–1938), minister, educator and diplomat 
 Chito Martínez (born 1965), baseball player
 Kenneth Medwood (born 1987), track and field athlete
 Nigel Miguel (born 1963), actor
 Rakeem Nuñez-Roches (born 1993), American football player
 Joe Pacheco (born 1985), mixed martial artist
 Milt Palacio (born 1978), basketball player
 Arlie Petters (born 1964), physicist
 Verno Phillips (born 1969), boxer
 Marion Reneau (born 1977), mixed martial artist
 Makonnen Sheran (born 1989), rapper
 Shyne (born 1978), rapper
 Lisa Tucker (born 1989), singer and actress 
 Simone Biles (born 1997), artistic gymnast and Olympic gold medalist
 Jarrell Miller (born July 15, 1988), professional boxer and former kickboxer
Joey Garcia (born November 2, 1960), author and media personality

See also

Demographics of Belize
Belize–United States relations

References

Further reading
 “Belizeans.” Encyclopedia of Chicago History (2005)
 Babcock, Elizabeth Cooling. "The transformative potential of Belizean migrant voluntary associations in Chicago." International Migration 44.1 (2006): 31-53. 
 Stabin, Tova. "Belizean Americans." Gale Encyclopedia of Multicultural America, edited by Thomas Riggs, (3rd ed., vol. 1, Gale, 2014), pp. 289–299. online
 Straughan, Jerome F. Belizean Immigrants in Los Angeles (University of Southern California, 2004).

External links
 U.S. Embassy in Belize
    Belize Culture and Heritage Association (BCHA)

 
Ethnic groups in Belize
Ethnic groups in Central America
Ethnic groups in the Caribbean